HMS Pembroke was a 60-gun fourth rate ship of the line of the Royal Navy, built to the dimensions of the 1719 Establishment at Woolwich Dockyard, and launched on 27 November 1733.

Notes

References

Lavery, Brian (2003) The Ship of the Line - Volume 1: The development of the battlefleet 1650-1850. Conway Maritime Press. .
Michael Phillips. Pembroke (60) (1733). Michael Phillips' Ships of the Old Navy. Retrieved 1 August 2008.

Ships of the line of the Royal Navy
1730s ships
Maritime incidents in 1749